Parthenocissus tricuspidata is a flowering plant in the grape family (Vitaceae) native to eastern Asia in Korea, Japan, and northern and eastern China.  Although unrelated to true ivy, it is commonly known as Boston ivy, grape ivy, and Japanese ivy, and also as Japanese creeper, and by the name woodbine (though the latter may refer to a number of different vine species).

Description
It is a deciduous woody vine growing to 30 m tall or more given suitable support, attaching itself by means of numerous small branched tendrils tipped with sticky disks. The leaves are simple, palmately lobed with three lobes, occasionally unlobed or with five lobes, or sufficiently deeply lobed to be palmately compound with (usually) three leaflets; the leaves range from 5 to 22 cm across. The flowers are inconspicuous, greenish, in clusters; the fruit is a small dark blue grape 5–10 mm diameter.

The specific epithet tricuspidata means three-pointed, referring to the leaf shape.

Cultivation and uses
Like the related Virginia creeper, this plant is widely grown as a climbing ornamental plant to cover the façades of masonry buildings.  This usage is actually economically important because, by shading walls during the summer, it can significantly reduce cooling costs.

Boston Ivy is readily distinguished from the Virginia creeper by its simple leaves with pointed lobes (Virginia creeper leaves are divided into five separate leaflets).

P. tricuspidata uses adhesive pads to attach to surfaces, allowing it to climb vertically up trees, walls, and other structures. Contact with a surface signals the adhesive pads to secrete mucilage through microscopic pores which dries and creates a robust adhesive bond. The ability of a single adhesive pad to support thousands of times their weight may be explored as a model for new biomimetic materials.

While it does not penetrate the building surface but merely attaches to it, nevertheless surface damage (such as paint scar) can occur from attempting to rip the plant from the wall. However, if the plant is killed first, such as by severing the vine from the root, the adhesive pads will eventually deteriorate to the point where the plant can be easily removed from the wall.

The Japanese ivy is used on the brick outfield walls at Wrigley Field of the Chicago Cubs along with Japanese bittersweet.

Cultivars include 'Veitchii'.

Etymology
Tricuspidata means approximately 'with three points' comes from the Greek and Latin prefix  ('three') and the Latin  ('tipped, pointed').

References 

tricuspidata
Vines
Flora of Japan
Flora of Korea
Flora of China
Garden plants of Asia